The Herzegovina Museum (Bosnian: Muzej Hercegovine) is a museum in Mostar, Bosnia and Herzegovina containing items associated with the history of the area.

History 
The museum was established in 1950 with the purpose to find, collect, keep and present the cultural and historical heritage of Mostar and Herzegovina. It is housed in the former home of Džemal Bijedić, the head of the Yugoslav Government who died in a plane crash in 1977. The building, constructed during the Austrian-Hungarian period, is an example of a mixture of architectural features between the Austrian-style dwelling and Oriental residency.

The Herzegovina Museum owns a collection of archaeological and ethnographic exhibits, as well as documents supplying information on the various periods of the city of Mostar and Herzegovina. It also features antique furniture and historical objects of daily use.

References

See also 
 List of museums in Bosnia and Herzegovina

Museums in Mostar
History museums in Bosnia and Herzegovina
Archaeological museums
Ethnographic museums in Europe
Museums established in 1950
1950 establishments in Bosnia and Herzegovina